Ramzan Adlanovich Akhmadov (4 February 1970 – 10 February 2001) was a Chechen brigadier general of the Chechen Armed Forces during the first and second Chechen war.

Family  

Ramzan had 5 brothers: Apti died in 2001, Rizvan died in 2002, Abu died in 1999, Huta died in 1999 in Dagestan, Zelimkhan died in 2002. His family was of the Gendargenoy Teip.

References

Chechen people
Chechen warlords
People of the Chechen wars
People from Taldykorgan
1970 births
2001 deaths
Gendargenoy